Jennifer L. Frisch is an American lawyer from Minnesota who is a Judge of the Minnesota Court of Appeals.

Education 

Frisch earned her Bachelor of Arts, magna cum laude, from Macalester College and her Juris Doctor, cum laude, from the University of Minnesota Law School.

Legal and academic career 

Frisch served as Senior Associate General Counsel at the University of Minnesota, where she represented the University as trial and appellate counsel in state and federal courts. She teaches legal writing and moot court at the University of Minnesota Law School, coaching and judging collegiate and high school mock trial, and teaches English language learner classes at Neighborhood House.

State court service 

On November 22, 2013, Governor Mark Dayton appointed Frisch to be a District Judge for the Second Judicial District in Ramsey County, Minnesota. She filled the vacancy created by Kathleen R. Gearin, who retired. She won election in 2016. During her time on the court she served as assistant chief judge for Ramsey County District Court.

Minnesota Court of  Appeals service 

In March 2020, Frisch was one of three candidates submitted by a merit selection panel to the Governor to fill a vacancy on the Court of Appeals. On April 1, 2020, Governor Tim Walz announced the appointment of Frisch to the Minnesota Court of Appeals to fill the vacancy left by the retirement of Edward Cleary. She took office on May 4, 2020.

References

External links 

1970s births
Living people
20th-century American lawyers
21st-century American lawyers
American women judges
20th-century American women lawyers
Macalester College alumni
Minnesota Court of Appeals judges
Minnesota lawyers
Minnesota state court judges
University of Minnesota Law School alumni
University of Minnesota Law School faculty
20th-century women lawyers
21st-century women lawyers
American women academics
21st-century American women